The Air Force Heritage Museum and Air Park, in Winnipeg, Manitoba displays aircraft and artifacts pertaining to the history of the Canadian Air Force. The park contains memorials to Canadian air search and rescue, and to the people who trained under the British Commonwealth Air Training Plan.  The museum was established in 1975.  Memorials in the park were dedicated in 1999.

The air park has the largest permanent display of Canadian military aircraft in Canada.  The attached museum has artifacts such as aviation art, Victoria Crosses (including the posthumous award to Andrew Mynarski), and one of the remaining Battle of Britain lace tapestries.

Aircraft on static display include:
 CF 116 Freedom Fighter fighter  
 CT 134 A Musketeer trainer
 CX 144 Challenger prototype air transport
 CH 136 Kiowa Helicopter
 CP-121 Tracker anti submarine warfare 
 CF-104 Starfighter interceptor/fighter
 CF-101 Voodoo interceptor
 Harvard Mk. 4 Trainer
 CF 100 Canuck
 F86 Sabre Mk. VI
 CT-133 Silver Star

The park also displays the antenna from an AN/FPS 508 search radar from the Pinetree Line.

References

External links
Story Telling in Lace: Battle of Britain Tapestries, retrieved August 1, 2017*Battle of Britain Artefacts Honour RCAF Heritage, retrieved August 1, 2017 

Aerospace museums in Manitoba

History of Canadian military aviation
History of the Royal Canadian Air Force
Museums in Winnipeg
Parks in Winnipeg